Scythropiodes gnophus is a moth in the family Lecithoceridae. It was described by Kyu-Tek Park and Chun-Sheng Wu in 1997. It is found in Sichuan, China.

The wingspan is 12–13 mm. The forewings are dark brown, covered with pale orange scales along the costal margin. The hindwings are grey.

Etymology
The species name refers to the dark ground colour of the forewings and is derived from Greek gnopos (meaning darkness or dust).

References

Moths described in 1997
Scythropiodes